Taazi is a Pakistani website and smartphone application focusing on music. It is the online music streaming service and a digital distributor of Lollywood, Coke Studio and other regional Pakistani music across the world. Taazi describes itself as a platform to combat piracy and give local musicians a medium to monetize their music through its unique billing system. Taazi features content of both established and upcoming musicians.

History
Taazi was created, over a 3 years period, by a team of programmers and musicians based in Islamabad. Taazi was founded and run by producer, director and musician Haroon. Taazi is a division of Unicorn Black, a media production and technology company that develops and produces original content.  Haroon is also the creator and director of the Pakistani animated TV series Burka Avenger.

About Taazi
Taazi was Pakistan's first legal music app and website. Taazi has more than 100,000 songs and more than 2,500 enlisted artists.

The Taazi app has had more than 100,000 downloads. Users living in Pakistan as well as abroad can download content by paying through mobile credit and PayPal. 70% of the revenue generated is given to the artists whereas 30% is retained by Taazi. Taazi is a platform that connects users with artists. Artists upload their content and subscribers download content legally.

Features
 Personal user profile
 Sharing of videos and songs
 Following of artists and friends 
 Offline streaming
 Creating and sharing of favorite playlists
 Inviting friends via email 
 Notification of activities performed on Taazi
 Posting of comments and liked / disliked content 
 Sign-up possible via Gmail, Email, Facebook, Twitter & Mobile Number
 A queue list for favorite songs
 A chat system

Content acquisition
Taazi works as a distribution platform. All content on Taazi is uploaded legally. Agreements in place for the most popular Pakistani music content including the following:
 Coke Studio Seasons 1–8
 Nescafe Basement Hits
 EMI Pakistan
 Digital Entertainment World
 Multiple independent record labels having access to thousands of Pakistani songs

References

Pakistani music websites
Entertainment companies of Pakistan
Internet properties established in 2015